Sandakphu or Sandakpur (3636 m; 11,930 ft) is a mountain peak in the Singalila Ridge on the border between India and Nepal. It is the highest point of the ridge and of the state of West Bengal, India. The peak is located at the edge of the Singalila National Park and has a small village on the summit with a few hotels. Four of the five highest peaks in the world, Everest, Kangchenjunga, Lhotse and Makalu can be seen from its summit. It also affords a pristine view of the entire Kangchenjunga Range.

Etymology
The name derives from the Tibeto-Burman Lepcha language and translates as "the height of the poisonous plant" - in reference to the former abundance at the locality (around a century ago) of the poisonous plants Aconitum ferox and certain Rhododendron species. So great was the danger of fatal poisoning to sheep and cattle being driven through the area that they had to be muzzled to prevent them grazing/browsing upon these toxic species (Aconitum ferox has a good claim to being the most poisonous plant species in the world).

Trekking

India 

The trek along the Singalila Ridge to Sandakphu and Phalut is one of the most popular in the Eastern Himalayas, owing not only to the stupendous vistas of the Kangchenjunga and Everest ranges which it affords, but also to its seasonal wildflowers and opportunities for birdwatching. Treks begin at Manebhanjan which is 28 km (approx. 1 hour by road) from Darjeeling.

Ascent 

The Sandakphu Trekking routes inside the Singalila National Park have four legs or stages.
 Manebhanjan to Meghma (2600 m): This is a 4-hour trek through the lower forest. The route goes via Chitre.
 Meghma to Gairibans (2621 m): There are two alternative trekking routes. They respectively go via Tonglu (3070 m) and Tumling (2900 m). From Tumling, a shorter trail cuts through Nepal and Jaubari (2750 m). Jaubari is ward no 07 of jamuna VDC ilam.  
 Gairibans to Sandakphu (3636 m):  
 Sandakphu to Phalut (3600 m):  It is a one-day trek via Sabarkum (3536 m) covering 21 km.

Descent 

 Retracing the way back to Manebhanjan.
 A steep descent to the village of Sirikhola on the banks of the River Sirikhola, via Gurdum (2300 m), and from there to Rimbick.

Panorama of Peaks seen from Sandakphu and Phalut

Baruntse (7220m), Chamlang (7319m), Chomo Lonzo (7818m), Lhotse (8516m), Makalu (8462m), Mount Everest (8848m), Nuptse (7861m), Kanchenjunga (8586m), Talung (7349m), Rathong (6679m), Kabru N (7353m), Koktang (6147m), Simvo (6812m), Frey (5853m), Kabru S (7318m), Kabru Dome (6600m), Kabru Forked (6100m), Pandim (6691m), Tenchenkhang (6010m), Jupono (5650m)

Villages At Glance: Gorkhey, Bhareng, Gairibas, Meghma, Maneybhanjyang, Rammam, Srikhola, Sepi, Molley, Gurdum

Nepal 

The western part of Sandakphu peak is located in Sandakpur rural municipality (ward no. 2 & 4) of Ilam District of Province No. 1.

The trekking starts from Ilam Bazar via Maipokhari, Maimajhuwa, Mabu, Kala Pokhri Bikhe Bhyanjyang to Sandakpur, and also from Ilam Bazar via Sulubung, Jamuna, Hangetham (a special area for birds such as the spiny babbler and blue tit), Piple, Kalipokhari, Bikhe Vanjyang to Sandakpur. On this trekking route, Jamuna is most valuable for trekkers. There are many beautiful places like Dhap Pokhari, Choyatar (special area for red pandas). There is a three jungle Hile Samudayik Ban, Choyatar Samudayik Ban, Hangetham Samudayik Ban.

Gallery

References

External links 

Mt Everest and Lhotse as seen from Sandakphu
In the Land of Sleeping Buddha - A Guide to Sandakphu Trek
Land of the Land Rovers - Community fleet of 57 Series I in daily use from Maneybhanjang to the Sandakphu summit
20 Stunning Photos of Sandakphu
Sandakphu Trek

Mountains of West Bengal
Mountains of Koshi Province
Villages in Darjeeling district
Highest points of Indian states and union territories
India–Nepal border
Geography of Darjeeling district